The 2014 season was the 25th season in Pelita Bandung Raya's history and the 2nd in the Indonesia Super League.

Review and events
PBR hired Dejan Antonić to replace Darko Janacković. They promoted three players from their youth academy to the senior squad this season and also promoted Heri Susanto on 15 July 2014.

After beating Persita Tangerang 3–1 on 5 September 2014, PBR advanced to the second round of the ISL. Four days later, Antonić's contract was extended for a further two years.

On 30 October 2014, the final matchday of the second round, PBR defeated local rivals Persib Bandung 2–1 to reach the semi-finals, where they lost 2–0 to Persipura Jayapura on 4 November.

Matches

Legend

Friendlies

Indonesia Super League

First round

Second round

Knockout stage

Squad

Source:

|}

Transfers

In

Out

Statistics

Clean sheets 
As of end of season.

Disciplinary record 
As of end of season.

Overview 
As of end of season.

Notes

1.Kickoff time in UTC+07:00.
2.Kickoff time in UTC+08:00.
3.Kickoff time in UTC+09:00.
4.PBR's goals first.

Sources

External links 
 2014 Pelita Bandung Raya season at ligaindonesia.co.id 
 2014 Pelita Bandung Raya season at pelitabandungraya.co 
 2014 Pelita Bandung Raya season at soccerway.com

Pelita Jaya
Pelita Jaya FC
Pelita Bandung Raya
Pelita Bandung Raya seasons